Buildup  may refer to:

 Atomic buildup, a concept in atomic physics
 Capital buildup, the gathering of objects of value
 Glacier ice buildup, an element in the glacier mass balance formula
 Build-up,  a tactic in association football

See also
 Build Up
 Built-up area